Joseph Caccia (born Giuseppe Caccia; January 19, 1898 – May 26, 1931) was an American racecar driver.  He was killed in a practice crash for the 1931 Indianapolis 500 along with riding mechanic Clarence Grove, when he crashed his car at turn 2, causing it to vault a wall, hit a tree, and catch on fire.

Indianapolis 500 results

See also
List of fatalities at the Indianapolis Motor Speedway

References

External links

1898 births
1931 deaths
Italian emigrants to the United States
People from Bryn Mawr, Pennsylvania
Racing drivers from Pennsylvania
Indianapolis 500 drivers
AAA Championship Car drivers
Racing drivers who died while racing
Sports deaths in Indiana
Racing drivers from Naples